Keith James Wheatley (born 20 January 1946 in Guildford, Surrey) is a retired English cricketer. Wheatley was a right-handed batsman and a right-arm off break bowler.

Wheatley represented Hampshire, making his first-class debut for the county in the 1965 County Championship season against Leicestershire. He made his List-A debut against Glamorgan in 1967. Wheatley's final first-class match for the club came in 1970 against Somerset and his final one-day game coming in the same year against local rivals Sussex. At the end of the 1970 season Wheatley left Hampshire.

Wheatley represented Hampshire in 79 first-class matches, scoring 1,781 runs at an average of 18.55. He also took 69 wickets at an average of 28.31 with his off breaks, including brilliant best figures of 4/1 against Glamorgan in 1968. In one-day cricket Wheatley fared less well, playing just 10 matches and scoring 53 runs at an average of 5.30.

External links
Keith Wheatley at Cricinfo
Keith Wheatley at CricketArchive

1946 births
Living people
Sportspeople from Guildford
People from Surrey
English cricketers
Hampshire cricketers